Pterocalla punctata is a species of ulidiid or picture-winged fly in the genus Pterocalla of the family Ulidiidae.

References

punctata
Insects described in 1909